Nadia Livers (born 17 October 1979) is a Swiss snowboarder. She competed in the women's parallel giant slalom event at the 2002 Winter Olympics.

References

External links
 

1979 births
Living people
Swiss female snowboarders
Olympic snowboarders of Switzerland
Snowboarders at the 2002 Winter Olympics
People from Chur
Sportspeople from Graubünden
21st-century Swiss women